Ilex diospyroides is a species of plant in the family Aquifoliaceae. It is endemic to Venezuela.

References

Flora of Venezuela
diospyroides
Least concern plants
Taxonomy articles created by Polbot